Marvin Bruce "Monk" Mattox (February 11, 1899 – May 5, 1956) was an American football player, coach and official. He was also an oil company distributor.

Playing career
Mattox was a guard in the National Football League. He played with the Milwaukee Badgers during the 1923 NFL season. He played college football for the Washington & Lee Generals, selected an All-Southern end in 1919.

References

1899 births
Milwaukee Badgers players
Washington and Lee Generals football players
People from Westmoreland County, Virginia
1956 deaths
Players of American football from Virginia
All-Southern college football players
American football ends
American football guards
People from Campbell County, Virginia